Thioredoxin, mitochondrial also known as thioredoxin-2 is a protein that in humans is encoded by the TXN2 gene on chromosome 22. This nuclear gene encodes a mitochondrial member of the thioredoxin family, a group of small multifunctional redox-active proteins. The encoded protein may play important roles in the regulation of the mitochondrial membrane potential and in protection against oxidant-induced apoptosis.

Structure

As a thioredoxin, TXN2 is a 12-kDa protein characterized by the redox active site Trp-Cys-Gly-Pro-Cys. In its oxidized (inactive) form, the two cysteines form a disulfide bond. This bond is then reduced by thioredoxin reductase and NADPH to a dithiol, which serves as a disulfide reductase. In contrast to TXN1, TXN2 contains a putative N-terminal mitochondrial targeting sequence, responsible for its mitochondria localization, and lacks structural cysteines. Two mRNA transcripts of the TXN2 gene differ by ~330 bp in the length of the 3′-untranslated region, and both are believed to exist in vivo.

Function 

This nuclear gene encodes a mitochondrial member of the thioredoxin family, a group of small multifunctional redox-active proteins. The encoded protein is ubiquitously expressed in all prokaryotic and eukaryotic organisms, but demonstrates especially high expression in tissues with heavy metabolic activity, including the stomach, testis, ovary, liver, heart, neurons, and adrenal gland. It may play important roles in the regulation of the mitochondrial membrane potential and in protection against oxidant-induced apoptosis. Specifically, the ability of TXN2 to reduce disulfide bonds enables the protein to regulate mitochondrial redox and, thus, the production of reactive oxygen species (ROS). By extension, downregulation of TXN2 can lead to increased ROS generation and cell death. The antiapoptotic function of TXN2 is attributed to its involvement in GSH-dependent mechanisms to scavenge ROS, or its interaction with, and thus regulation of, thiols in the mitochondrial permeability transition pore component adenine nucleotide translocator (ANT).

Overexpression of TXN2 was shown to have attenuated hypoxia-induced HIF-1alpha accumulation, which is in direct opposition of the cytosolic TXN1, which enhanced HIF-1alpha levels. Moreover, although both TXN2 and TXN1 are able to reduce insulin, TXN2 does not depend on the oxidative status of the protein for this activity, a quality which may contribute to their difference in function.

Clinical Significance 

It has been demonstrated that genetic polymorphisms in the TXN2 gene may be associated with the risk of spina bifida.

TXN2 is known to inhibit transforming growth factor (TGF)-β-stimulated ROS generation independent of Smad signaling. TGF-β is a pro-oncogenic cytokine that induces epithelial–mesenchymal transition (EMT), which is a crucial event in metastatic progression. In particular, TXN2 inhibits TGF-β-mediated induction of HMGA2, a central EMT mediator, and fibronectin, an EMT marker.

Interactions
TXN2 is shown to interact with ANT.

References

Further reading 

 
 
 
 
 
 
 
 

Proteins
Genes